40th & Colorado station (sometimes stylized as 40th•Colorado) is a Regional Transportation District (RTD) commuter rail station on the A Line in the Elyria-Swansea neighborhood and adjacent to the Park Hill neighborhood of Denver, Colorado. The station is the second eastbound station from Union Station in Downtown Denver and fifth westbound from Denver International Airport. About nine minutes from Union Station and 28 minutes from Denver Airport station.

40th & Colorado station is also served by several bus routes and has a 200-space park-and-ride lot.

The station opened on April 22, 2016, along with the rest of the A Line.

References

RTD commuter rail stations in Denver
2016 establishments in Colorado
Railway stations in the United States opened in 2016